Giorgi Kakhiani (born December 10, 1973, in Tbilisi) is a Georgian lawyer and politician.

Education and career 
In 1995 he graduated from Ivane Javakhishvili Tbilisi State University, Faculty of Law.

1999-2004 he worked at the Supreme Court, the judge's assistant. 2004 - 2005 he worked at the Language and Culture University, was a member of the International Relations Department, the head teacher; 2005 - 2007 he worked at the Constitutional Court, the Legal Department, the main adviser. 2007 - 2011 he was the Tbilisi State University Faculty of Law, Assistant Professor; Associate Professor since 2001 . 2013- In 2016 he was a member of the Parliament of Georgia of the 8th convocation (Samtredia majoritarian), the election bloc: "Bidzina Ivanishvili - Georgian Dream ". 2016 - 2020 he was on the 9th Parliament of the party list, the election bloc: "Georgian Dream - Democratic Georgia". 2013-2019 he held the Parliamentary Procedural Issues and Rules Committee Chairman. In 2019 he was appointed Vice-Speaker of the Parliament of Georgia.

Since 2020, he has been a member of the Parliament of Georgia of the 10th convocation by party list, election bloc: "Georgian Dream - Democratic Georgia".

References

External links 
 Biographical Dictionary of Georgia

1973 births
Living people
Members of the Parliament of Georgia
21st-century politicians from Georgia (country)
Georgian Dream politicians